Roy Bell may refer to:

 Roy Bell (Canadian football) (born 1949), Canadian footballer
 Roy Bell (ornithologist) (1882–1966), New Zealand and Australian ornithologist
 Roy Bell (rugby league) (born 1984), Australian rugby league player
 Roy Bell (politician) (1885–1953), Australian politician